Parthenina penchynati is a species of sea snail (a marine gastropod mollusk) in the family Pyramidellidae, the pyrams and their allies. The species is one of a number within the gastropod genus Parthenina.

Distribution
This species occurs in the following locations:
 Portuguese Exclusive Economic Zone
 Spanish Exclusive Economic Zone

References

External links
 To CLEMAM
 To Encyclopedia of Life

Pyramidellidae
Gastropods described in 1883